Ivar van Dinteren (born 3 May 1979) is a former Dutch professional footballer. He most recently served as an assistant coach for FC Cincinnati of Major League Soccer.

Playing career

Club
Born in Bussum, Van Dinteren played as a striker for FC Groningen, RKC, Helmond Sport, FC Zwolle, Stormvogels Telstar, VV Noordwijk and Dayton Dutch Lions.

Managerial career
In 2011, he ended his playing career and started as head coach of Dayton Dutch Lions in the USL Pro. After a few seasons with the PEC Zwolle academy, he was named coach at hometown club SDO Bussum and in summer 2017 he also took the reins at te Almere City reserves.

In August 2019, Van Dinteren was hired by Major League Soccer club FC Cincinnati as an assistant coach, joining the club at the same time as head coach Ron Jans. He departed from the club in June 2020 after the club hired a new manager, Jaap Stam.

References

1979 births
Living people
People from Bussum
Dutch footballers
Association football midfielders
FC Groningen players
RKC Waalwijk players
Helmond Sport players
PEC Zwolle players
SC Telstar players
VV Noordwijk players
Dayton Dutch Lions players
Eredivisie players
USL League Two players
USL Championship players
Dutch expatriate footballers
Expatriate soccer players in the United States
Dutch expatriate sportspeople in the United States
Dutch football managers
Dayton Dutch Lions coaches
FC Cincinnati non-playing staff
FC Twente non-playing staff
SDO Bussum players
Footballers from North Holland